The opposite-colored bishops endgame is a chess endgame in which each side has a single bishop and the bishops reside on opposite-colored squares.  Without other  besides pawns, these endings are widely known for their tendency to result in a draw.  These are the most difficult endings in which to convert a small  advantage to a win.  With additional pieces, the stronger side has more chances to win, but not as many as when bishops are on the same color.

Many players in a poor position have escaped a loss by trading down to such an endgame.  These endgames are sometimes drawn when one side has an advantage of two or even three pawns, since the weaker side can create a blockade on the squares on which their bishop operates.

General principles
Edmar Mednis gives two principles for endgames with bishops on opposite colors:
 If a player is down  he should look for drawing chances in an endgame with only the bishops and pawns.
 With  (queen or rook) on the board, having bishops on opposite colors favors the side with an attack.

Ian Rogers gives three principles when there are only the bishops and pawns: 
 Two connected pawns are not sufficient to win unless they reach their sixth 
 If the attacker has two widely separated passed pawns that cannot be controlled by the opposing bishop on a single diagonal, they usually win
 When the attacker has an outside passed pawn, it should be stopped by the bishop only when the king can block the opposing king.

Drawing tendency
In endings with opposite-colored bishops, a  advantage is less important than in most endgames and position is more important. Positions when one side has an extra pawn are usually drawn and even two extra pawns (and occasionally more) may not be enough to win. About half of the endings with a bishop and two pawns versus a bishop on the opposite color are drawn. (By contrast, over 90% are won if the bishops are on the same color.)

Zugzwang is a tool that often helps the superior side win an endgame.  It is a fairly common occurrence in endings with bishops on the same color but is much less common in endgames with opposite-colored bishops.

The weaker side should often try to make his bishop  by placing his pawns on the same color of his bishop in order to defend his remaining pawns, thereby creating an impregnable fortress.  The attacker should generally put his pawns on squares of the opposite color as his bishop to prevent a blockade.

Bishop and pawn versus bishop

The attacker's bishop is practically useless and the defender can normally draw if his king can reach any square in front of the pawn that is not of the color of the attacking bishop; or if his bishop can permanently attack any square in front of the pawn.  These endings are trivially drawn 99% of the time.

Bishop and two pawns versus a bishop

About half of these positions are drawn.  In most other endings, a two pawn advantage is usually an easy win.  For comparison, if the bishops were on the same color, 90% of the positions would be wins.

There are three general cases, depending on the two pawns.  In most endings, a pair of connected pawns have the best winning chances, but in these endings, a widely separated pair of pawns have the best chances unless one of the pawns is the wrong rook pawn.

Doubled pawns
With doubled pawns the position is a draw if the defending king can reach any square in front of the pawns that is not of the color of the attacker's bishop. If the defending king and bishop cannot accomplish this, the first pawn will win the defending bishop and the second one will promote.

Isolated pawns

With isolated pawns (on non-adjacent files), the outcome depends on how widely separated the pawns are.  The more widely separated they are, the better the winning chances.  The rule that holds in most cases is that if only one file separates the pawns the game is a draw, otherwise the attacker wins.  The reason is that if the pawns are more widely separated, the defending king must block one pawn while his bishop blocks the other pawn.  Then the attacking king can support the pawn blocked by the bishop and win the piece.  If only one file is between the pawns, the defender can stop the advance of the pawns.  See the diagram. If three files separate the pawns, the pawns normally win.  However, there are positions where the defender can set up a blockade, especially if one of the pawns is the wrong rook pawn.

In this position from Yuri Averbakh, Black draws since the bishop can restrain both pawns on the same diagonal with the help of the king and the white bishop is helpless.
1. Kd5 Kf6! 
The white king will not get to e6.
2. Kc5 Ke7
3. Kb5 Bf4
4. Kb6 Kd8, draw.

An example is the game N. Miller vs. A. Saidy, American Open 1971. White  in this position because he knew a "rule" articulated by  Fine in the first edition of Basic Chess Endings: "If the pawns are two or more files apart, they win." Since here three files separate the pawns, White assumed his position was hopeless. However, the position is actually a fairly straightforward draw, since "White's King has such a powerful active location that he can keep Black's King from penetrating either side of the board.". Play might continue 1. Bh3+ Ke7 2. Bg2 Kf6 3. Bh3 Kg5 4. Bg2 Kf4 5. Kc4! Bd4 6. Kd3 Bg1 7. Bc6 Kg4 8. Bg2! Bf2 9. Kc4! Kf4 10. Kd3 Ke5 11. Kc4, when, "Clearly there is no way for Black to break the blockade."

Wrong rook pawn

If one of the two pawns is the wrong rook pawn (i.e. an a- or h-pawn whose queening square is the opposite color from the squares on which the superior side's bishop moves), a fortress may allow the inferior side to draw irrespective of how far apart the two pawns are. This is illustrated by Alekhine–Ed. Lasker, New York City 1924. (complete game) Three files separate Black's two pawns, but the players agreed to a draw after 52.Bb1 Kg7 53.Kg2. Alekhine explained in the tournament book that White "can now sacrifice his Bishop for the [d-pawn], inasmuch as the King has settled himself in the all-important corner".

If one of the pawns is the wrong rook pawn, it does not matter how widely separated or how advanced the pawns are.  The outcome depends on whether or not the defending king can get into the corner in front of the rook pawn and sacrifice his bishop for the other pawn.

Recap
Grandmaster Jesus de la Villa emphasizes the importance of this endgame and gives this breakdown depending on how many files separate the pawns:
 If the pawns are separated by two files:
 Two  normally win
 If the pawns are separated by three files:
 With a knight pawn there are drawing chances if the pawn is far advanced
 With a rook pawn the position is usually won
 If the pawns are separated by four files
 The ending is won because the attacking king gets between the pawns.

Connected pawns
If the pawns are on the opposite color as the defender's bishop, the defender may be able to blockade the pawns and draw. If both pawns can safely reach the sixth rank, they win unless one is the wrong rook pawn, i.e. the rook pawn that promotes on the square of the same color as the defending bishop.

The ideal drawing setup is seen in the diagram at left. Black's king (on a square not of the color of the opposing bishop) and bishop stay two ranks in front of the pawns, with both defending against a pawn advance (here d6 by White) to the same color square as the bishop. The defending bishop must maintain an attack on the pawn on the same color square as itself, so that the attacking king is not allowed to advance. If White  the other (unattacked) pawn, Black's bishop  itself for both pawns, with a draw. (If the second pawn is protected and advances instead, the position is also a draw.)  In the diagram position, Black on move passes (i.e. a waiting move that maintains the attack on the pawn) with 1... Bb8! 2. Ke4 Bc7! 3. Kf5 Bb8! and so on. White cannot make progress: 4. d6+ is met, as always, by 4... Bxd6 5. exd6+ Kxd6 with an immediate draw; 4. e6 gives Black an unbreakable blockade on the dark squares; and White can never prepare for d6+ by playing Kc5 because Black plays ... Bxe5.

A similar position with White's pawns on the sixth rank is a win because the black bishop has no room to move and maintain the attack on the pawn on d6, thus Black is defeated because of zugzwang. In the position at right, Black loses immediately. Black, on move, must give way with either bishop or king, allowing White to move e7, winning, or else play the hopeless 1... Bxd6 2. Kxd6. If White is to move in this position, he plays a waiting move such as 1. Kc6, placing Black in the same predicament (1... Ke8 2. Kc7#).

More pawns

Draws are possible with more pawns.  This is an example of a drawing fortress with opposite-colored bishops when three pawns behind.  White simply keeps his bishop on the h3 to c8 diagonal. (See Fortress (chess)#Opposite-colored bishops.)  Positions with three pawns versus none are wins 90% of the time.

Examples from master games

Berger vs. Kotlerman

In Berger versus Kotlerman, the pawns are separated by two files, but the game was drawn.

 1. Ke2 b3
 2. Kd1 Kb4
 3. Bh7 Ka3
 4. Bg6 Kb2
 5. Bf7! Ka2
 6. Be6 Ka3
 7. Bf5! 
If 7...b2, then 8.Bb1. If Black keeps his king near the b-pawn, then White moves his king.  If the king goes to g2 trying to displace the white king, White moves the bishop.

Piskov vs. Nunn

In this game Black has an inferior position, but he draws by exchanging queens and rooks, giving up two pawns, and reaching a drawn endgame:

37. Bf6 Qh5!
38. Qxh5 gxh5
39. Rxe8+ Bxe8
40. Be7 Bg6
41. Bxc5 Kf7!
42. Bxd4 a6
43. a3 Bd3
44. c5 Bc4
45. d6 Ke6
46. Kf2 Kd7

The blockade has been set up.  Black's pawns can be protected by his bishop and White's passed pawns cannot make any progress.  The game continued:
47. Kg3 Be6
48. h4 Kc6
49. ½–½

Nunn

In this position from Nunn (a slight modification of a simultaneous game), White wins:
 1... Be1
 2. Kf6! Bh4
 3. Kf5 Kd6
 4. g3 fxg3
 5. Bg2 Kc7 
 6. Ke5 g4
 7. hxg4
and White wins easily by supporting the g-pawn with the king.  Black loses because he cannot defend the pawn on g5 with the bishop from d8 or e7.  If the black king were on b8, then 1...Ba5 would draw.

Sokolov vs. McShane

In the game between Ivan Sokolov and Luke McShane, Black discards his pawn and goes for a stalemate defense:
 1... c4!?
 2. Bxc4 Kf8
 3. h5 Ke7
 4. Bb3 Kf8
 5. f6 Ke8 ½–½
and a draw was agreed because White cannot break through, e.g. 6.Ba4+ Kf8 7.h6 Bxf6 8.Kxf6 stalemate.

Lautier vs. Rublevsky

In this position, Black sacrifices a pawn (leaving him three pawns down) to reach a fortress.
 1... Kf5!
 2. Kxf7 Bh5+
 3. Kg7 Bd1
 4. Be7 ½–½
After 4...Be2 5.Kh6 Bd1 6.h5 Black just waits by playing 6...Be2.

Kotov vs. Botvinnik

Another position illustrating the principle stated above is from the game Kotov–Botvinnik, Moscow 1955. Grandmaster Lev Alburt writes, "Black has an extra pawn, but his opponent appears to have a reasonable blockade in place." However, Botvinnik finds a way to create another passed pawn.
1... g5!! 2. fxg5 
2.hxg5 h4 3.Bd6 Bf5 4.g6 Bxg6 5.f5 Bxf5 6.Kxb3 Kg2 costs White his bishop and the game.
2...d4+! 
Black must keep his b-pawn.
3. exd4 
Black has gone from being a pawn up to temporarily being a pawn down, but he has a won game. If 3.Bxd4, then 3...Kg3 4.g6 Kxh4 5.Kd2 Kh3!! 6.Bf6 h4 7.Ke2 Kg2!.
3... Kg3! 
Not 3...Kg4? 4.d5! Bxd5 5.Bf2, drawing.
4. Ba3 
4.g6 Kxh4 5.g7 Kg4 also wins. 4.Be7 Kxh4 5.g6+ Kg4 wins.
4... Kxh4 5. Kd3 Kxg5 6. Ke4 h4 7. Kf3 
Or 7.d5 Bxd5+.
7... Bd5+

Fischer vs. Donner

In this game between Bobby Fischer and Jan Hein Donner, White was winning, but Black had a swindle to save the game by getting to a drawn opposite-colored bishop endgame.  Play continued:

 30... Rxc2
 31. Bxf5 Rc1 
 32. Qxc1 Bxc1
 33. Kf1 h6 
If 33.d5, then 33...Ba3 stops the pawn.
 34. Ke2 Kf8 ½–½

If Fischer had won this game, he would have tied with Boris Spassky for first place in the 1966 Piatigorsky Cup tournament.

Fischer vs. Polugaevsky

In this position from a game between Fischer and Lev Polugaevsky a pair of rooks had just been exchanged.  An endgame with opposite-colored bishops was reached, with three pawns to two, which was a dead draw.

Vidmar vs. Maróczy
In this 1932 game between Milan Vidmar and Géza Maróczy, White was three pawns ahead, but was unable to win.  Pawns are doubled on the rook , which would give White the wrong rook pawn, making the white bishop unable to assist in promotion.  The game ended in a draw on move 129, because checkmate was impossible.  Before the end, two insignificant underpromotions to bishops occurred.

Advantageous with positional considerations
As stated above, in endgames with opposite-colored bishops, positional factors may be more important than material differences.  John Nunn makes two points:
 usually the number of passed pawns is more important than the total number of pawns
 small changes in the pawn structure may have a large effect.

Against weak pawns

In some cases with more pawns on the board, if one side has weak pawns then it is actually advantageous to the other side to have the bishops on opposite colors. The game continued: 
 29. Kd2 Ke7
 30. Kc3 f6
 31. Kd4 Be6
 32. Kc5 Kd7
 33. Kb6 g5
 34. Kxa6 Kc7
 35. Bb6+ Kc8
 36. Bc5 Kc7
 37. Bf8 f5
 38. Bxg7 f4
 39. Bf6 f3
 40. gxf3 exf3
 41. Bxg5 Bxh3
 42. Bf4+

Positional advantages

Although endgames with opposite-colored bishops tend to be drawish, even with a material advantage, in some cases positional advantages can be enough to win with the same material on both sides.  In this position from a 1956 game between Reinhart Fuchs and Ratmir Kholmov, Black's positional advantages enabled him to win.

In this 1976 game between Bojan Kurajica and Anatoly Karpov, the material is even but Black has pinned down White's  pawns and is preparing to break through.  Black needs to create another weakness or passed pawn to win.  White resigned after move 57.

As a defensive resource
Occasionally opposite-colored bishops endings offer a defender better prospects for a draw than same-colored bishops endings. The weaker side can set up a color-blockade, so the side with the extra material or exchange cannot attack.

Liem vs. Svidler

Smyslov vs. Vaganian

Additional pieces
If both sides have an additional matching piece, the situation is much more complex and cannot be easily codified.  Generally, the presence of the additional pieces gives the stronger side more winning chances.  Glenn Flear calls these "NQE"s ("Not Quite Endgames"). The initiative is important in these types of endgames.

Knight

With each side having a knight in addition to the bishops, the main idea is for the stronger side to create two passed pawns.  If this can be done then the exchange of knights is acceptable for the stronger side.  However, the exchange of knights may benefit the defender, especially if there is only one passed pawn and he has no other weaknesses.  This endgame occurs in about 0.6% of games between high-rated players.

Rook

If each side has a rook in addition to the bishop, the stronger side has many more winning prospects.  The attacking rook can have influence on both colors of squares.  Sometimes exchanging the rook for the defender's bishop breaks a fortress.  Sometimes the defending bishop can be sacrificed for pawns to result in a rook and bishop versus rook endgame that can be drawn.  The most difficult problem encountered by the stronger side is usually in breaking a blockade by the opposite bishop.  These endgames occur in 2.8% of the games between high-rated players.

Example

This type of endgame was reached in a 2006 game between Veselin Topalov and Levon Aronian, see the first diagram. (The game and analysis is on this page and the game score is also here.)  White was able to make slow progress (see the second diagram, showing the position after 72 moves).  

The game concluded:
 73. Rd4! Be6+
 74. Kf8 Ra8+
 75. Bd8 Bg4
 76. c6 1–0
Black resigned because the pawn will advance to c7 and Black cannot defend against rook attacks on the seventh rank and the h-file.

Queen

When each side has an additional queen, the possibility of exchanging them is a paramount concern.  The stronger side should try to get two widely spaced passed pawns before exchanging queens.  Defending squares of the color of the stronger side's bishop can be difficult if there are weaknesses or threats on both sides of the board.  The stronger side must increase his advantage before exchanging queens and sometimes this is done with a direct attack on the king. These endgames occur in 0.8% of the games between high-rated players.

History

The earliest opposite-colored bishop endgame in the ChessBase database is an 1862 game between Louis Paulsen and Adolf Anderssen in their unofficial world championship match.  It was a draw because of the wrong rook pawn.  Play continued:
 55. Bf5+ Kh2
 56. Bc2 h4
 57. Be4 ½–½

This 1620 game between an unknown player and Gioachino Greco was won by Black on move 50.

Quotes
 "In endings with bishops of opposite color, material means NOTHING, position EVERYTHING." — Cecil Purdy (emphasis in the original)

References

Bibliography

Further reading
 Benko, Pal. "Opposite-Colored Bishops", Chess Life, November 2007, 56–57.

External links
 Edgar Walther vs. Bobby Fischer, 1959 Fischer draws two pawns down

Chess endgames
Chess theory